The 2014 Dunlop Series was an Australian motor racing competition for V8 Supercars. It was the fifteenth running of the V8 Supercar Development Series, a support series to the International V8 Supercars Championship. The 2014 season featured a new format for the Dunlop Series weekends. Each round of the series – with the exception of Bathurst – featured two forty-minute races, rather than a range of two-race and three-race weekends.

2002 series winner Paul Dumbrell became the third driver to clinch a second title, after winning six races (and three rounds) during the season; this included four consecutive wins at Queensland Raceway, the Bathurst endurance race and the first race at Sydney Olympic Park. Despite missing the second Barbagallo race due to business commitments, Eggleston Motorsport's Dumbrell won the series by 247 points ahead of Ford Performance Racing driver Cameron Waters. Waters won two races at Winton and the second Sydney Olympic Park race, where he also took the round win to move ahead of Ashley Walsh, who had held the runner-up spot for Matt Stone Racing prior to the event. Walsh won three races and two rounds in the early part of the series, but faded towards the end of the season. The series top five was rounded out by New Zealand's Chris Pither (Brad Jones Racing) and Andre Heimgartner (MW Motorsport), who won races at Townsville and Barbagallo respectively. Pither also won the round at Townsville, his first in the series.

Teams and drivers

The following teams and drivers competed in the 2014 series.

Calendar
The series comprised thirteen races at seven venues, with each race being a support race at an International V8 Supercars Championship event.

Points system
Points were awarded for each race at each two-race round on the following basis.

Note: Double points were awarded for the single race at Mount Panorama.

Series standings

References

External links

2014 Dunlop Development Series, www.v8supercars.com.au, as archived at web.archive.org

Supercars Development Series
Dunlop V8 Supercar Series